John Kent Nye (23 May 1914 – 26 January 2002) was an English cricketer active from 1934 to 1947 who played for Sussex. He was born in Isfield, Sussex and died in Chichester. He appeared in 99 first-class matches as a righthanded batsman who bowled left arm fast medium. He scored 885 runs with a highest score of 55 and took 304 wickets with a best performance of six for 95. Nye moved to Kenya after finishing with Sussex in 1947.

John was a top class International and County Road walker and champion and often took part in the 53 mile London to Brighton walk, which he won twice.

See also
Playfair Cricket Annual, 1st edition, 1948

References

1914 births
2002 deaths
English cricketers
Sussex cricketers
English expatriate sportspeople in Kenya
People from Isfield